Jaghdari (also Romanized as Jaghdarī; also known as Jahd Darī) is a village in Lalehzar Rural District, Lalehzar District, Bardsir County, Kerman Province, Iran. At the 2006 census, its population was 502, in 126 families.

References 

Populated places in Bardsir County